Terria may refer to:

Terria, WWII airfield in Libya No. 462 Squadron RAAF
Terria, hamlet in Ferentillo
Terria (consortium) Australian telecoms
Terria (Devin Townsend album)

See also
Terrie, a given name